Parker is a city in Turner County, South Dakota, United States. The population was 1,194 at the 2020 census. It is the county seat of Turner County. Parker is bordered on its eastern side by South Dakota State Highway 19. Its northern side is bordered by South Dakota State Highway 44.

History
Parker was established in 1879 as county seat; it was incorporated as a city in 1883. The name Parker was the maiden name of a railroad official's wife.

Geography
Parker is located at  (43.397152, -97.137297).

Parker has been assigned the ZIP code 57053 and the FIPS place code 48380.

Demographics

2010 census
As of the census of 2010, there were 1,022 people, 438 households, and 292 families living in the city. The racial makeup of the city was 95.6% White, 0.3% African American, 0.4% Native American, 0.1% Asian, 0.2% Pacific Islander, and 1.5% from two or more races. Hispanic or Latino of any race were 2.0% of the population.

There were 438 households, of which 32.0% had children under the age of 18 living with them, 54.8% were married couples living together, 7.3% had a female householder with no husband present, 4.6% had a male householder with no wife present, and 33.3% were non-families. 29.9% of all households were made up of individuals, and 16% had someone living alone who was 65 years of age or older. The average household size was 2.33 and the average family size was 2.85.

The median age in the city was 39.8 years. 25.3% of residents were under the age of 18; 5% were between the ages of 18 and 24; 26.4% were from 25 to 44; 25.4% were from 45 to 64; and 17.9% were 65 years of age or older. The gender makeup of the city was 48.6% male and 51.4% female.

2000 census
As of the census of 2000, there were 1,031 people, 431 households, and 293 families living in the city. The racial makeup of the city was 97.96% White, 0.39% African American, 0.48% Native American, 0.10% Asian, and 1.07% from two or more races. Hispanic or Latino of any race were 0.39% of the population.

There were 431 households, out of which 29.7% had children under the age of 18 living with them, 57.1% were married couples living together, 8.6% had a female householder with no husband present, and 32.0% were non-families. 28.8% of all households were made up of individuals, and 17.2% had someone living alone who was 65 years of age or older. The average household size was 2.34 and the average family size was 2.88.

In the city, the population was spread out, with 24.2% under the age of 18, 5.7% from 18 to 24, 26.0% from 25 to 44, 21.0% from 45 to 64, and 23.0% who were 65 years of age or older. The median age was 41 years. For every 100 females, there were 94.9 males. For every 100 females age 18 and over, there were 89.1 males.

As of 2000 the median income for a household in the city was $37,250, and the median income for a family was $44,226. Males had a median income of $28,698 versus $20,909 for females. The per capita income for the city was $17,225. About 7.7% of families and 7.4% of the population were below the poverty line, including 5.7% of those under age 18 and 12.6% of those age 65 or over.

County fair
Parker has hosted the Turner County Fair, the oldest county fair in South Dakota, for most of its years since the first fair in 1880. The Turner County Fair now hosts its own web site which is including not only the Fair's attractions but also its history, the school houses of Turner County, and annual grounds happenings.

References

External links

Cities in Turner County, South Dakota
Cities in South Dakota
County seats in South Dakota
Sioux Falls, South Dakota metropolitan area
Populated places established in 1883